Mariano Bernardini (born 14 January 1998) is an Italian footballer who plays as a midfielder for  club Legnago.

Career

Paganese 
Born in Naples, Bernardini started his career in the Paganese youth team. On 4 September 2016, Bernardini made his professional debut in Serie C for Paganese Calcio 1926 in a 2–1 away defeat against Matera, he was replaced by Raffaele Stoia in the 57th minute, in that season he was also an unused substitute 3 times.

Genoa 
On 31 January 2017, Bernardini was signed by Serie A side Genoa with an undisclosed fee.

Loan to Paganese 
On 21 July 2017, Bernardini returned to Serie C club Paganese on a season-long loan deal. On 30 July he made his debut for Paganese in a 6–0 away defeat against Trapani in the first round of Coppa Italia, he played the entire match. On 2 September, Bernardini played his first match in Serie C for Paganese in this season, a 2–0 away win over Cosenza, he was replaced by Thadee Alvaro Ngamba in the 59th minute. On 25 February 2018, Bernardini played his first entire match for Paganese, a 1–0 home defeat against Fidelis Andria. Bernardini ended his season-long loan to Paganese with 14 appearances, including only 6 as a starter.

Loan to Lucchese 
On 31 July 2018, Bernardini was signed by Serie C side Lucchese on a season-long loan deal.

Loan to Pontedera
On 29 June 2019, he was loaned to Pontedera on Serie C.

Serie D
On 24 January 2020. he moved to Real Aversa.

On 4 January 2021, he joined to Vado.

For the 2021–22 season, he joined to Cassino.

Career statistics

Club

References

External links
 
 

1998 births
Footballers from Naples
Living people
Italian footballers
Association football midfielders
S.S.D. Lucchese 1905 players
Paganese Calcio 1926 players
U.S. Città di Pontedera players
F.C. Legnago Salus players
Serie C players
Serie D players